Raja is a common given name and a surname, derived from Sanskrit राजन् (rajan), meaning "king", "ruler".

Given name 
Raja (Tamil actor), Indian Tamil-language film actor
Raja Abel (born 1978), Indian film actor
Raja Babu (Punyamurthula Appalaraju, Adeel Raja; 1937–1983), Indian actor
Raja Bell (born 1976), American basketball player
Raja Bundela, Indian actor and politician
Raja Chaudhary (born 1975), Indian television actor
Raja Chelliah (1922–2009), Indian economist
Raja Fenske (born 1988), American actor
Raja Gemini (Sutan Amrull; born 1974), American make-up artist and drag performer
Raja Gosnell (born 1958), American film director
Raja Ali Haji (1808–1873), Malay historian, poet and scholar
Raja Hasan (born 1979), Indian playback singer
Raja Petra Kamarudin (RPK; born 1950), Malaysian blogger
Raja Kannappan, Indian politician
Raja Kashif (born 1978), British musician
Raja Koduri, Indian-American computer engineer
Raja Nawathe (1924–2005), Indian film director
Raja Paranjape (1910–1979), Indian film actor and director
Raja Pervaiz Ashraf (born 1950), Pakistani politician and businessman
Raja Rafe (born 1983), Syrian footballer
Raja Ramanna (1925–2004), Indian nuclear physicist
Raja Rao (1908–2006), Indian philosopher and writer
Raja Shehadeh (born 1951), Palestinian lawyer and writer
Raja Sen (born 1955), Indian film and television director
Raja Toumi (born 1978), Tunisian handball player
Raja Ravi Varma (1848–1906), Indian artist

Surname 
A. Raja (Andimuthu Raja; born 1963), Indian politician
A. K. T. Raja, Indian politician
A. M. Raja (politician) (born 1928), Indian politician
Abid Raja (born 1975), Pakistani-Norwegian lawyer and politician
Adeel Raja (born 1980), Pakistani-Dutch cricketer
Allar Raja (born 1983), Estonian rower
Altaf Raja (born 1967), Indian singer
Andres Raja (born 1982), Estonian decathlete
Basit Raja (born 1993), Danish cricketer
D. Raja (born 1949), Indian politician
Dharma Raja (1724–1798), Maharajas of Travancore
Farzana Raja (born 1970), Pakistani politician
Hason Raja (1854–1922), Bangladeshi poet
Jewel Raja (born 1989), Indian football player
K. S. Raja (Kanakaratnam Sriskandarajah; ?–1989), Sri Lankan radio journalist
Kanishka Raja (born 1970), artist
Karthik Raja (born 1973), Indian musician
Kasthuri Raja, Indian film director
L. Raja, Indian film director and actor
M. Raja (Raja Mohan), Indian film director
Masood Ashraf Raja (born 1965), Pakistani literary and political scientist and writer
Pazhassi Raja (1753–1805), Indian freedom fighter
Purav Raja (born 1985), Indian tennis player
Ramiz Raja (born 1962), Pakistani former cricketer
Rameez Raja (born 1987), Pakistani cricketer
Review Raja, Canadian film critic
Rubina Raja, Danish professor of Classical archaeology
S. Raja, Tamil orator, actor.
Samina Raja (1961–2012), Pakistani writer and translator
Sivaji Raja, Indian film actor
T. Raja (born 1967), Indian humanitarian
T. K. Raja, Indian politician
Tarana Raja (born 1977), Indian film and television actress and dancer
Wasim Raja (1952–2006), Pakistani cricketer
Yuvan Shankar Raja (born 1979), Indian playback singer and composer
Zaeem Raja (born 1965), Pakistani former cricketer

Fictional characters
 Rajah, Jasmine's pet tiger in Aladdin.

Similar Arabic name

Raja is an Arabic given name. The meaning of name Raja is "Hope" or Hopeful.

 Raja ibn Haywa, was a prominent early Muslim theological and political adviser of the Umayyad caliphs Abd al-Malik (r. 685–705), al-Walid I (r. 705–715), Sulayman (r. 715–717) and Umayyad caliph Umar (r. 717–720).

See also 
 Rajah (disambiguation)

Indian masculine given names
Estonian-language surnames
Pakistani masculine given names